Dakshineswar Nath Mahadev Mandir  is a historical and an ancient Hindu temple in the Mithila region of the Indian state of Bihar, in Madhubani district at Uttra village in Madhwapur block. It is believed that the ancient Vedic King Daksha Prajapati in Satya Yuga came here to worship the god. This temple is also known as Daksheshwar Nath Mahadev Mandir. The upbhransh word of Daksheshwar is now a day is Dakshineswar. So present time this temple is known as Dakshineswar Nath Mahadev Mandir.

Description 

At this Shiva temple, there is a special tradition that after Jalabhishek, it is customary to offer heads of paddy bushes  and rice flour roti on the Shivling. According to the sanyashi Bakhat Giri, this tradition is practiced from his 8th generation clans before him. Some of them are Kishori Giri, Ramchandra Giri, Shambhu Giri, Biltu Giri, Saroj Giri, Sanjay Giri and more. It is believed that the devotees who offer rice and rice flour roti with devotion to the Shivling of the temple,  his descendants never lack money, food, happiness and prosperity.  Rather, it maintains happiness and prosperity throughout the region. Every year local people of the area fill holy water from Dhaus river near Pehwada and do Jalabhishek on the Shivling of the temple. This temple is very famous for Mahashivratri festival celebrated on the occasion of the anniversary of the marriage of the Lord Shiva and the Goddess Parvati. It is also very famous for Narak Niwaran Chaturdashi festival of Lord Shiva.

References 

Hindu temples in Bihar
Shiva temples in Bihar
Mithila
Madhubani district